Ivoy-le-Pré is a commune in the Cher department in the Centre-Val de Loire region of France.

Geography

Population

Sights
 The church of St. Aignan, dating from the thirteenth century.
 The château d’Ivoy, dating from the seventeenth century.
 A disused watermill.

Personalities
 Nicolas Leblanc, chemist, was born here on December 6, 1742.
 Félix Millet, born here in 1844, was the inventor of an early motorbike, the motocyclette.
 Rémy Chauvin, biologist and entomologist lived here at the château in the 1990s.

See also
Communes of the Cher department

References

Communes of Cher (department)